Se Dice Bisonte, No Búfalo (It's Called Bison, Not Buffalo) is the third studio album by Omar Rodríguez-López and the second in the "Amsterdam series". It was written and recorded in 2005 in California and Amsterdam, and was released May 29, 2007 by Gold Standard Labs on both vinyl and CD.  A limited edition, brown marble vinyl was also available.  750 were made to fulfill pre-orders through April 30.

Production
It is one of six albums written and recorded by Omar Rodríguez-López whilst living in Amsterdam in November 2005. Se Dice Bisonte, No Búfalo was conceived simultaneously to The Mars Volta's Amputechture and Omar's soundtrack to the Jorge Hernández Aldana film, El Búfalo de la Noche, which is where the title for the album originates. In the album's liner notes, Omar expressed that this record is a response and expression of his feelings of the film, the soundtrack of which will feature The Mars Volta contributions. The album artwork is provided by longtime collaborator Damon Locks of The Eternals.

Content
Se Dice Bisonte, No Búfalo consists of 3 vocal tracks and 7 instrumentals, and includes an alternate version of the song Please Heat This Eventually (without the vocals of Damo Suzuki) recorded live at a concert in Kortrijk, Belgium. Omar performed the majority of the compositions solo, although the album also includes performances by The Mars Volta members Cedric Bixler-Zavala, Marcel Rodriguez-Lopez, Juan Alderete and Adrián Terrazas-González. It also features cameos by Money Mark, John Frusciante, and former Mars Volta drummer Jon Theodore who appears on the final track, which was recorded while he was still a part of the group.

"Rapid Fire Tollbooth" eventually became a part of The Mars Volta's live set, and evolved into the song "Goliath" which appears on their studio album The Bedlam in Goliath.

"Lurking About In A Cold Sweat (Held Together by Venom)" contains a chord progression similar to an officially unreleased song recorded by The Mars Volta during the Noctourniquet sessions, as well as a few instrumental jams, that were leaked in 2013 with as part of the so-called Ramrod Tapes. As the title of The Mars Volta song has never been officially confirmed, fans refer to it as "Clouds" or "Orchestrina."

Sales 
Se Dice Bisonte, No Búfalo is Omar's first solo album to chart on a Billboard music chart, peaking at #40 on the Top Heatseekers chart.

Track listing

Personnel 
Omar Rodríguez-López – guitars, bass (1-4, 5, 8, 10), drums (1), vocals (1), wurlitzer (4, 8), synths (4, 8-10), rhodes (8), Piano (10)
Adrián Terrazas-González – woodwinds & percussion (3, 5-7, 9), Soprano (9)
Marcel Rodriguez-Lopez – drums & percussion (3, 5-9), synths (7, 9), clavinet (8)
Juan Alderete – bass (3, 5, 7, 9)
Money Mark – keyboards (3), piano (5), organ, clavinet, synths (7)
Cedric Bixler-Zavala – vocals & lyrics (3, 5, 10)
John Frusciante – guitars (6)
Jon Debaun – voice (9)
Jon Theodore – drums (10)

Production
Omar Rodríguez-López – production, engineering
Jon Debaun - engineering
Robert Carranza - mixing
Pete Lyman - mastering

References

2007 albums
Omar Rodríguez-López albums
Gold Standard Laboratories albums
Albums produced by Omar Rodríguez-López